Beale is a family name.

Beale may also refer to:

In places:
Beale, West Virginia, an unincorporated community
Beale Air Force Base, a U.S. Air Force base in Yuba County, California
Beale Mountains, small range in the Mojave National Preserve in eastern California
Beale Park, wildlife park and gardens by the River Thames in Berkshire, England
Beale Street, historic street in Downtown Memphis, Tennessee
Beale Township, Pennsylvania, U.S.

In other uses:
USS Beale (DD-471), a Fletcher-class destroyer of the U.S. Navy
Beale ciphers (or Beale papers), three encrypted documents allegedly disclosing a treasure location
Beale code, an American classification of geography
Beale number, a parameter that characterizes the performance of Stirling engines
Beale Piano, a piano brand formerly manufactured in Sydney Australia
Beale plc, a British department store group usually known by its trading name of Beales

See also
Bealeton, Virginia